Tanzania has competed in thirteen of the fourteen Commonwealth Games since 1966, following the formation of the country in 1964, missing only the 1986 Commonwealth Games. One of its predecessor states, Tanganyika, competed in the 1962 British Empire and Commonwealth Games.

Overall medal tally

History
At the 2006 Commonwealth Games, Tanzania was nineteenth in the medal tally with two medals, and was twenty-fourth in the All-time tally of medals, with an overall total of 21 medals.

References